The 1941 All-Ireland Senior Football Championship was the 55th staging of Ireland's premier Gaelic football knock-out competition.

Foot-and-mouth disease
There was major disruption to the format of the 1941 championship due to a serious outbreak of foot-and-mouth disease in many parts of Munster and south Leinster. The championship was run on a knockout provincial basis as usual; however, there was a certain amount of tweaking required to cope with the situation. Dublin, for instance, did not contest the All-Ireland semi-final as Leinster champions; they were nominated to play the game and their Leinster final against Carlow (which Dublin won) was postponed until November.

Munster Championship format change
Kerry, were a bye team to the Munster final, Cork a bye team to the Munster semi-final, A Preliminary Round game was contested between Tipperary and Waterford - the winners were awarded the Quarter-final against Clare. Limerick refused to take part in the Championship. It was also used in the 1939 championship but this format did not exist again until 1980.

Results

Connacht Senior Football Championship

Leinster Senior Football Championship

Munster Senior Football Championship

Ulster Senior Football Championship

All-Ireland Senior Football Championship

The 1941 semi-final replay, held in Tralee, was the last All-Ireland semi-final replay to be held outside Croke Park until the 1983 replay between Cork and Dublin in Páirc Uí Chaoimh.

Championship statistics

Miscellaneous

 Some games were affected by foot and mouth problems. It meant that the Tipperary vs Clare game awarded to Clare without being played & only at least 25 instead of the usual 31-32 teams took part in the championship.
 Kerry won their second ever three in a row as All Ireland Champions giving a total of 15 titles the most for a year.

References